Joseph Peter Pantoliano (born September 12, 1951) is an American character actor who has appeared in over 150 films, television and stage productions.

After his early roles in the television series M*A*S*H and the 1983 comedy Risky Business, he gained recognition for his numerous supporting roles in high-profile films and television series; including Hill Street Blues, The Goonies, La Bamba, Empire of the Sun, NYPD Blue, Memento, and Bad Boys and its sequels. He starred as Cosmo Renfro in the thriller film The Fugitive and five years later in its spin-off thriller film U.S. Marshals with 3 co-stars Tommy Lee Jones, Daniel Roebuck, and LaTanya Richardson, and Caesar in the Wachowskis' directorial debut Bound and played Cypher in their second film The Matrix (1999) with 3 co-stars Keanu Reeves, Carrie-Anne Moss, and Laurence Fishburne, as well as Michael Gorski in their Netflix series, Sense8 (2015–2018). His role as Ralph Cifaretto on the HBO crime drama The Sopranos won him the Primetime Emmy Award for Outstanding Supporting Actor in a Drama Series.

Pantoliano is a published author and is active in the field of mental health, having documented his mother's issues and his own. He founded the nonprofit No Kidding, Me Too! dedicated to removing the stigma from mental illness.

Early life and education 
Pantoliano was born on September 12, 1951, in Hoboken, New Jersey, the son of Italian-American parents Mary (née Centrella), a bookie and seamstress, and Dominic "Monk" Pantoliano, a hearse driver and factory foreman. Pantoliano's family moved to Cliffside Park, New Jersey, where he attended Cliffside Park High School.

He attended HB Studio, and studied extensively with actors John Lehne and Herbert Berghof.

Career 

He first grew to fame as "Guido the Killer Pimp" in 1983's Risky Business. In 1985 he appeared as the villainous Francis Fratelli in teen classic The Goonies. He gained fame among a new generation as Cypher in the 1999 landmark sci-fi film The Matrix. He won a Primetime Emmy Award for Outstanding Supporting Actor in a Drama Series for the role of Ralph Cifaretto in HBO's The Sopranos. 

Pantoliano is also known for his role as Eddie Moscone, the foul-mouthed, double-crossing bail bondsman, in the Robert De Niro comedy Midnight Run, as Captain Conrad Howard in Bad Boys and its sequels Bad Boys II and Bad Boys for Life, as double-crossed mafioso Caesar in Bound, as John "Teddy" Gammell in Memento, and as investigative journalist Ben Urich in Mark Steven Johnson's 2003 Daredevil adaptation. He played Deputy U.S. Marshal Cosmo Renfro in The Fugitive along with Tommy Lee Jones and reprised the role in the sequel U.S. Marshals.

In 2003 Pantoliano replaced Stanley Tucci in the Broadway play Frankie and Johnny in the Clair de Lune.

In 2012 Pantoliano starred as the eccentric pawn broker Oswald Oswald in the film adaptation of Wendy Mass's popular children's book Jeremy Fink and the Meaning of Life, written and directed by Tamar Halpern. In 2013, he was cast as Yogi Berra in the Broadway production of Bronx Bombers, but dropped out during rehearsals due to "creative differences." From 2015 to 2018 he played Michael Gorski in the Wachowskis' Netflix series Sense8.

When not acting, Pantoliano writes. He is the author of two memoirs: Who's Sorry Now: The True Story of a Stand-Up Guy, and Asylum: Hollywood Tales From My Great Depression: Brain Dis-Ease, Recovery and Being My Mother's Son. In the latter, he writes about his addictions to alcohol, food, sex, Vicodin, and Percocet, before being diagnosed with clinical depression.

Personal life 
Pantoliano and his wife Nancy Sheppard, a former model, have four children. He was introduced to his wife by his friend, actress Samantha Phillips.

On October 9, 2007, Pantoliano announced on the National Alliance on Mental Illness blog that he had been suffering from clinical depression for the last decade, although he was only formally diagnosed recently. He claims that his 2006 film Canvas helped him come to terms with his depression. Rather than hide his illness from the public, he has chosen to speak out about it to remove some of the stigmas commonly associated with mental illness. He founded a nonprofit organization, No Kidding, Me Too!, to unite members of the entertainment industry in educating the public about mental illness. The title comes from the response he has frequently heard after divulging how mental illness affected him and his family. In 2009, he directed, wrote, and starred in his first documentary called NO KIDDING! ME 2!! He also has dyslexia.

After a Sopranos episode in which his character brutally beat a young stripper to death, during an interview he stated, "After the episode aired a lot more women started hitting on me. I thought it was very revealing." During his tenure on the show, Pantoliano struggled to stay anonymous in New Jersey. To avoid being recognized by fans he wore a wig based on the hair style of Christopher Nolan, with whom he had worked in Memento.

On May 1, 2020, Pantoliano was struck by a vehicle while walking, and suffered a concussion and chest trauma.

Filmography

Film

Television

Video games

Awards and nominations

Bibliography 
Who's Sorry Now: The True Story of a Stand-Up Guy, Joe Pantoliano, David Evanier, Dutton Books (2002), 
Asylum, Joe Pantoliano, Hachette Books (2013),

References

External links 

 
 Joe Pantoliano interview with ABILITY Magazine

1951 births
Living people
American people of Italian descent
Cliffside Park High School alumni
Male actors from Connecticut
Male actors from New Jersey
American male film actors
American male television actors
American male video game actors
American male voice actors
Mental health activists
People from Cliffside Park, New Jersey
People from Hoboken, New Jersey
People from Wilton, Connecticut
20th-century American male actors
21st-century American male actors
Outstanding Performance by a Supporting Actor in a Drama Series Primetime Emmy Award winners
Actors with dyslexia